Bawku is a town and is the capital of the Bawku Municipal District, district in the Upper East region of north Ghana, adjacent to the border with Burkina Faso. Bawku has a 2012 settlement population of 69,527 people.

Cultural and Tourist Sites

Naa Gbewaa Shrine
The "tomb" of, Naa Gbewaa, the founder of the Mamprusi, Dagomba, and Nanumba tribes, is located just a few kilometers from Bawku in Pusiga in the Upper East Region of Ghana. Legend states that Naa Gbewaa never died but simply vanished into the ground. The shrine was thought to have been built in the 14th century in commemoration of Naa Gbewaa, and is today a place of spiritual reverence.

References

Populated places in the Upper East Region
Burkina Faso–Ghana border crossings